Khlamovo is a rural locality (a village) in Semizerye Rural Settlement, Kaduysky District, Vologda Oblast, Russia. The population was 7 as of 2002.

Geography 
Khlamovo is located 60 km northwest of Kaduy (the district's administrative centre) by road. Savelyevskaya is the nearest rural locality.

References 

Rural localities in Kaduysky District